Clara Nezbah Sherman (February 18, 1914 – July 31, 2010) was a Navajo artist particularly known for her Navajo rugs. She was the last surviving member of ten siblings including an adopted sister. Sherman and her siblings learned to weave as children from her family, who specialized in the craft. Clara had several children with her husband, John Sherman. Her daughters and granddaughters also learned to weave.

She played the harmonica, and could "keep a melody and bass line going at the same time."

In 2006, she was awarded the Governor's Award for Excellence in the Arts by the governor of New Mexico in association with the National Endowment for the Arts. She is one of the artists whose work is available at the historic Toadlena Trading Post on New Mexico Arts' Fiber Arts Trail.

References

External links 
Video of Clara Sherman carding and spinning wool, YouTube
Photos of Clara Sherman
Woven rug portrait of Clara playing her harmonica

Native American textile artists
Navajo artists
American weavers
American harmonica players
1914 births
2010 deaths
People from San Juan County, New Mexico
20th-century American women artists
Native American women artists
Women textile artists
20th-century Native Americans
21st-century Native Americans
20th-century Native American women
21st-century Native American women